Pammene felicitana is a species of moth of the family Tortricidae. It is found in North America, where it has been recorded from Alberta, Florida, Illinois, Indiana, Kentucky, Maine, Maryland, North Dakota, Ohio, Oklahoma, Ontario, Pennsylvania, Quebec and Vermont.

The wingspan is about 13 mm. Adults are on wing from May to July.

References

Moths described in 1923
Grapholitini